= Juozas Žukauskas =

Lithuanian footballer

Personal information
- Position: Defender

International career
Years	Team	Apps	(Gls)
1924–1927	Lithuania	5	(0)

Juozas Žukauskas was a Lithuanian footballer. He played in five matches for the Lithuania national football team from 1924 to 1927. He was also part of Lithuania's squad for the football tournament at the 1924 Summer Olympics, but he did not play in any matches.
